Geneva Glen Camp is a co-educational, non-profit, residential summer camp located in Indian Hills, Colorado. It was founded in 1922 at its current site.

References

Buildings and structures in Jefferson County, Colorado
Summer camps in Colorado
1922 establishments in Colorado